The Big Ten Conference Pitcher of the Year is a college softball award given to the Big Ten Conference's most outstanding pitcher. The award has been given annually since 1992.

Winners

Winners by school

References

Awards established in 1992
Pitcher
NCAA Division I softball conference players of the year